Kampung Hulu Mosque is a mosque situated at Kampong Hulu Village in Malacca City, Malacca, Malaysia. It is the oldest mosque in Malacca and among the oldest in the country, having originally built around the year 1720–1728 and underwent renovation in 1892. The architectural design of the mosque is a cross between Javanese Architecture, Local 
Malay, Sumateran, and Sini. The minaret, ablution pool and entrance arch were built at the same time with the main building. The minaret resembles a pagoda with the style of "Balai Nobat Melayu". An ancient cemetery lies next to the mosque in where some notable preachers and missionaries are buried.

See also
 Islam in Malaysia

References

External links

 
 Tourism Malaysia - Kampung Hulu's Mosque
 Kampung Hulu Mosque (archnet.org)

1728 establishments in Asia
1728 establishments in the Dutch Empire
Mosques in Malacca
Mosques completed in 1728